Mhairi Catherine Gilmour-McGuire (born 9 June 1980) is a Scottish international footballer who plays as a midfielder or forward for Scottish Women's Premier League (SWPL) club Celtic. Previously, Gilmour played full-time club football with Djurgårdens of Sweden and ÍBV of Iceland.

Gilmour made her debut for the Scotland women's national team in 1996 against Brazil and went on to win 39 caps, scoring twice. The teenaged Julie Fleeting was Gilmour's contemporary at Ayr United and in the Scottish national team.

In August 2002 Gilmour signed for Swedish Damallsvenskan club Djurgårdens. She also played professionally in Iceland for ÍBV between 2003–2004, alongside compatriot Michelle Barr.

References

External links

1980 births
Living people
Scotland women's international footballers
Scottish women's footballers
Expatriate footballers in Sweden
Expatriate footballers in Iceland
Celtic F.C. Women players
Hibernian W.F.C. players
Djurgårdens IF Fotboll (women) players
Damallsvenskan players
Women's association football midfielders
Scottish expatriate women's footballers
Scottish expatriate sportspeople in Sweden
Scottish expatriate sportspeople in Iceland